Dion Bailey (born March 2, 1992) is a former American football safety. He was signed by the Seattle Seahawks as an undrafted free agent in 2014. He played college football at USC.

College career
Bailey attended the University of Southern California from 2010 to 2013. After redshirting as a freshman in 2010, he switched to linebacker, where he started as a freshman and sophomore. As a freshman, he was the Pac-12 Defensive Freshman of the Year. He finished the season with 81 tackles, two sacks and two interceptions. As a sophomore, he started all 13 games, recording 80 tackles, four interceptions and a sack. As a junior, he moved back to safety. He finished his junior season with 61 tackles and five interceptions. After the season, at the recommendation of his agent Joey "SSF" Ingraham, he announced that he would forgo his senior season and enter the 2014 NFL Draft.

Professional career

2014 NFL Combine

Seattle Seahawks
Bailey signed with the Seattle Seahawks after going unselected in the 2014 NFL Draft. The Seahawks waived/injured him on August 5, 2014, but was placed on the team's injured reserve after clearing waivers the next day. He was later released with an injury settlement. Bailey was signed to the Seahawks' practice squad on October 4, 2014. He was waived on September 26, 2015.

New York Jets
Bailey was claimed off waivers by the New York Jets on September 28, 2015.

Bailey was waived/injured by the New York Jets on August 30, 2016. After going unclaimed on waivers, Bailey reverted to the team's injured reserve list. After reaching an injury settlement with the Jets, Bailey was released from the reserve list on September 2, 2016.

References

External links
Seattle Seahawks bio
USC Trojans bio

1992 births
Living people
People from Lakewood, California
Players of American football from California
American football safeties
American football linebackers
USC Trojans football players
Sportspeople from Los Angeles County, California
Seattle Seahawks players
New York Jets players